Un, deux, trois, French for One, two three.

It may refer to:

"Un, deux, trois", French entry in the Eurovision Song Contest 1976
"Un, Deux, Trois" (Candies song)
"Un, deux trois", song by Fredericks Goldman Jones from their album Fredericks Goldman Jones

See also
Un, deux, trois, soleil, 1993 French comedy film directed by Bertrand Blier
Un deux trois quatre! short title for 1-2-3-4 ou Les Collants noirs, English title Black Tights, 1961 French anthology film featuring four ballet segments